Molla Azim Rudini (also Romanized as Mollā ʿAz̧īm Rūdīnī) is a village in Dust Mohammad Rural District, in the Central District of Hirmand County, Sistan and Baluchestan Province, Iran. At the 2006 census, its population was 415, in 78 families.

References 

Populated places in Hirmand County